Count On Me Singapore is a Singaporean National Day song composed by Canadian musician Hugh Harrison and arranged by Jeremy Monteiro. It was composed for the 1986 National Day Parade and was first performed by Clement Chow. The song's production was sponsored by the beverages company Fraser and Neave.

In 2020, during the COVID-19 pandemic, Chow and a number of Singaporean singers sang a modified version of the song titled Stay at Home, Singapore to encourage Singaporeans to stay at home during the nationwide lockdown.

Plagiarism allegations
In 1999, Indian songwriter Joseph Mendoza recorded and sold the rights of a song named We Can Achieve to Christian record company Pauline India. The lyrics and melody of Achieve are similar to that of Singapore, and Mendoza has been accused of plagiarism as a result. In response to accusations, Mendoza stated that he composed Achieve in 1983, three years before Singapore was composed. After composition, he claimed to have performed to the song in an orphanage in Mumbai. He also claimed that the original masters of the song were destroyed in the 2005 Mumbai floods. The Singapore Ministry of Culture, Community, and Youth has challenged the claim, citing that Achieve "appears to have been substantially copied from Count on Me, Singapore" and has requested Mendoza to provide proof. Hugh Harrison and Jeremy Monteiro, who were involved in the composition of Singapore, have also disputed the claims, with Harrison threatening to sue Mendoza for libel. Mendoza retracted his claims on 18 March 2021.

References

External links
 Recording of Count On Me Singapore

Singaporean songs
1986 songs